Ables may refer to:

5175 Ables, an asteroid
Harry Ables (1883–1951), American Major League Baseball pitcher
Tony Ables (born 1954), American serial killer
Adult Blood Lead Epidemiology and Surveillance, a US National Institute for Occupational Safety and Health program

See also
Jon St. Ables (1912–1999), British-born Canadian cartoon artist
Able (disambiguation)
Ables Springs, Texas, United States, an unincorporated community